is a resonant trans-Neptunian object and binary system from the Kuiper belt in the outermost regions of the Solar System. It was discovered on 16 September 1998, by American astronomer Nichole Danzl at the Kitt Peak National Observatory in Arizona. It is classified as a twotino and measures approximately 280 kilometers in diameter. Its minor-planet moon was discovered in 2001.

Twotino 

 has a semi-major axis (average distance from the Sun) near the edge of the classical belt. The Deep Ecliptic Survey (DES) list this trans-Neptunian object as a twotino that stays in a 1:2 orbital resonance with the planet Neptune (for every one orbit that a twotino makes, Neptune orbits twice).

Physical characteristics 

The observations with the infrared Spitzer Space Telescope combined with the orbits established using the Hubble Space Telescope allow the estimation of the density, assuming the components of equal albedo.

The resulting estimate of 
is similar to the density of the binary plutino 47171 Lempo (0.3–0.8 g/cm3) and Saturn's moon Hyperion
Such a low density is indicative of a highly porous composition dominated by ice.

 is fairly red, with a color comparable to 79360 Sila–Nunam.

Satellite 

On 22 December 2001, a minor-planet moon, provisionally designated , was discovered by American astronomer Michael Brown and Chad Trujillo using the Hubble Space Telescope. The discovery was announced in January 2002. Assuming a circular orbit, this takes  days to complete one orbit.

Numbering and naming 

This minor planet was numbered by the Minor Planet Center on 5 July 2001. As of 2018, it has not been named.

References

External links 
 List Of Transneptunian Objects, Minor Planet Center
 
 

026308
Discoveries by Nichole M. Danzl
026308
19980916